Tenzin Jigme (Thutob Wangchuk) (Lhasa, 1948 – February 13, 1997) was a Tibetan tulku and the sixth Reting Rinpoche.

His reincarnation is recognized by the Tibetan government. His recognition is being challenged by another sixth Reting Rinpoche who acts by the title of Reting Hutukthu; hutukthu equal to rinpoche and mainly in use in Mongolia.

Life
Tenzin Jigme was identified as the reincarnation of the fifth Reting Rinpoche Jamphel Yeshe Gyaltsen in 1951 and enthroned in 1955.

In 1956 (eight years old) he was the first to be assigned to the Tibet Committee of the Buddhist Association of China.

Jigme stayed in Tibet when the Tibetan government went in exile in 1959 during the Tibetan diaspora. During the Cultural Revolution (1966–1976) he was publicly denounced by the authorities because of his religious position. Next he was imprisoned for one year. Later he was rehabilitated and at the end of the 1970s he was appointed to several official posts. Comparably with the tenth Panchen Lama he was married and lived as a layman.

His next reincarnation was appointed by the People's Republic of China. This reincarnation is not recognized by the Tibetan government in exile.

References

Klieger, P. Christiaan Tibet, self, and the Tibetan diaspora, Brill, Leiden, 
World Tibet Network News (January 11, 2000) Beijing Discovers Another "Living Buddha" (AFP)
World Tibet Network News (June 19, 2000) Reting monks detained following protest over reincarnation

1948 births
1997 deaths
Reting Rinpoches
Lamas
Tulkus
Rinpoches
Gelug Lamas